This article lists the results for the Scotland national football team between 1980 and 1999.

Key

Key to matches
Att. = Match attendance
(H) = Home ground
(A) = Away ground
(N) = Neutral ground

Key to record by opponent
Pld = Games played
W = Games won
D = Games drawn
L = Games lost
GF = Goals for
GA = Goals against

Results
Scotland's score is shown first in each case.

Record by opponent

British Home Championship record by season
The British Home Championship was discontinued after the 1983–84 season.

Notes

References

External links
RSSSF: Scotland – International Results
Scottish FA: National Team Archive
London Hearts Supporters' Club

1980-1999
1979–80 in Scottish football
1980–81 in Scottish football
1981–82 in Scottish football
1982–83 in Scottish football
1983–84 in Scottish football
1985–86 in Scottish football
1984–85 in Scottish football
1986–87 in Scottish football
1987–88 in Scottish football
1988–89 in Scottish football
1989–90 in Scottish football
1990–91 in Scottish football
1991–92 in Scottish football
1992–93 in Scottish football
1993–94 in Scottish football
1994–95 in Scottish football
1995–96 in Scottish football
1996–97 in Scottish football
1997–98 in Scottish football
1998–99 in Scottish football
1999–2000 in Scottish football